Den Hout is a village in the Dutch province of North Brabant. It is located in the municipality of Oosterhout.

The village was first mentioned in 1311 as "Rolinus dictus van den Houte", and means deciduous forest. The area around Den Hout was settled during Roman times, but abandoned in 273. Den Hout developed in the Middle Ages around a triangular village square.

The St Cornelius Church was built between 1877 and 1878 in Gothic Revival style and as an octagon spire.

Den Hout was home to 650 people in 1840.

Gallery

References

Populated places in North Brabant
Oosterhout